This is a list of geographical features in the state of Bavaria, Germany.

Mountains 

See list of mountains of Bavaria

Rivers 

See list of rivers of Bavaria

Lakes 

See list of lakes in Bavaria

Cities 

See list of cities and towns in Germany and list of cities in Bavaria by population

Miscellaneous 

 Bavarian Forest National Park
 Berchtesgaden National Park
 Hallertau
 Nördlinger Ries
 Partnach Gorge

Place
Bav
 Place